An annular solar eclipse occurred on January 3, 1927. A solar eclipse occurs when the Moon passes between Earth and the Sun, thereby totally or partly obscuring the image of the Sun for a viewer on Earth. An annular solar eclipse occurs when the Moon's apparent diameter is smaller than the Sun's, blocking most of the Sun's light and causing the Sun to look like an annulus (ring). An annular eclipse appears as a partial eclipse over a region of the Earth thousands of kilometres wide. Annularity was visible from New Zealand on January 4 (Tuesday), and Chile, Argentina, Uruguay and southern Brazil on January 3 (Monday).

Observations
View of the eclipse from Buenos Aires

Related eclipses

Solar eclipses 1924–1928

Inex series

Saros 140 

It is a part of Saros cycle 140, repeating every 18 years, 11 days, containing 71 events. The series started with partial solar eclipse on April 16, 1512. It contains total eclipses from July 21, 1656, through November 9, 1836, hybrid eclipses from November 20, 1854, through December 23, 1908, and annular eclipses from January 3, 1927, through December 7, 2485. The series ends at member 71 as a partial eclipse on June 1, 2774. The longest duration of totality was 4 minutes, 10 seconds on August 12, 1692.

Tritos series

Notes

References 

1927 1 3
1927 1 3
1927 in science
January 1927 events